Býšovec is a municipality and village in Žďár nad Sázavou District in the Vysočina Region of the Czech Republic. It has about 200 inhabitants.

Administrative parts
The village of Smrček is an administrative part of Býšovec.

Notable people
Libor Hájek (born 1998), ice hockey player

References

Villages in Žďár nad Sázavou District